Lou Goodwin (born 15 July 1991) is an Australian professional rugby league footballer who was signed to the Canberra Raiders in the National Rugby League. He plays as a second-rower and can also play as a lock.

Background
Goodwin was born in West Wyalong, New South Wales, Australia.

Playing career

Between 2010 and 2011 Goodwin was captain of the Sydney Roosters under 20’s team.

The NRL Rookie
Goodwin won the Nine Network's reality TV show, The NRL Rookie, on 2 August 2016. As a result, he was offered contracts from the Canberra Raiders and the Gold Coast Titans, and ended up signing a deal to play for the Canberra Raiders.

Personal life
Goodwin is the son of former first grade player, Matt Goodwin. Lou grew up in the small town of West Wyalong in central west NSW, playing rugby league from a young age. He played for the West Wyalong Malleemen and won a junior premiership. Goodwin went to boarding school in the small town of Forbes representing Red Bend Catholic College.

After a stint in the under 20s competition at the Sydney Roosters, Goodwin made his way to the town of Albury where he played for the Albury Thunder in the Group 9 Rugby League competition, where he had a hand in three premierships. In one of the grand finals, he also received best on ground.

References

1991 births
Living people
Australian carpenters
Participants in Australian reality television series
Reality show winners
Rugby league locks
Rugby league players from New South Wales
Rugby league second-rows